Jeffrey Scott Skinner (born May 16, 1992) is a Canadian professional ice hockey left winger for the Buffalo Sabres of the National Hockey League (NHL). He previously played for the Carolina Hurricanes for eight seasons, and was an alternate captain of the Hurricanes from 2016 to 2018.

Selected seventh overall by the Hurricanes in the 2010 NHL Entry Draft, Skinner was the youngest player in the NHL during the  season and is the youngest player ever to play in the NHL All-Star Game, as well as any All-Star game within the four major North American sports leagues. He won the Calder Memorial Trophy for best rookie in the 2010–11 season, becoming the first Hurricanes player to do so.

As of March 8, 2022, Skinner holds the NHL record amongst active players for most games played without a playoff appearance with 882. He is second all-time to Ron Hainsey’s 907 games.

Early life
Skinner was born on May 16, 1992, to lawyers Andrew Skinner and Elisabeth Campin. He has five siblings, each of whom either are or have been involved with hockey. He is the second-youngest among those siblings, four of which are sisters: Jennifer, Andrea, Erica, and the youngest of the Skinner family, Jillian. Andrea formerly served as captain of the Cornell University women's hockey team and was named to Hockey Canada's board of directors in 2020,  and later appointed as interim chair, the first woman to lead the organization   He also has one brother, Benjamin, who was in the Kitchener Rangers system, but now plays for the Herforder EV in Germany.

Playing career
Involved in both ice hockey and figure skating growing up, he won a bronze medal in the juvenile division at the 2004 Canadian Junior National Figure Skating Championships. Soon after, he made the decision to focus solely on hockey. Skinner played minor ice hockey with the Toronto Jr. Canadians and Toronto Young Nationals of the Greater Toronto Hockey League and the Markham Waxers of the Ontario Minor Hockey Association. In his midget hockey career Skinner played on the wing with future Colorado Avalanche captain Gabriel Landeskog. He played in the 2005 Quebec International Pee-Wee Hockey Tournament with Markham.

Junior

Coming off a successful season with the Toronto Young Nationals, Skinner was drafted 20th overall in the 2008 Ontario Hockey League (OHL) draft by the Kitchener Rangers. He made his OHL debut on September 18, 2008, where he recorded two goals and an assist in the 4–2 win over the Plymouth Whalers. By November 13, 2008, Skinner was selected to compete with Team Canada at the 2009 World U-17 Hockey Challenge, where he helped the team win a gold medal by scoring the game-winning goal. A few days later, Skinner was presented with the Rangers Academic Player of the Month Award for his academic success while attending Eastwood Collegiate Institute.

After leading the Rangers in scoring through his rookie campaign, Skinner participated in the 2009 Ivan Hlinka Memorial Tournament, scoring 6 goals for 6 points, while winning the gold medal with Team Canada. Upon his return to the Ontario Hockey League for his sophomore season, he was named an Assistant Captain alongside Mike Mascioli. During the season, Skinner scored 50 goals and led all CHL draft-eligible forwards in goal scoring. He became the first Ranger in 23 years to reach the 50-goal milestone. However, despite leading the league in goals at the time, the NHL Central Scouting Bureau ranked Skinner as the 47th best North American skater during their midterm rankings, and only 34th during the final rankings. This contrasted ratings from other organizations such as ISS and TSN's Bob McKenzie who had him much higher.

Professional

Carolina Hurricanes
In his first year of eligibility, Skinner was drafted in the first round, seventh overall, by the Carolina Hurricanes in the 2010 NHL Entry Draft. At the time of his selection, the Hurricanes’ director of amateur scouting stated ”There’s nobody in the draft that scores goals like Jeff Skinner." During his first NHL training camp, he signed a three-year, entry-level contract with the Hurricanes on September 21, 2010, worth $2.7 million. On October 7, Skinner made his NHL debut with the opening roster in the Hurricanes' 4–3 win against the Minnesota Wild during the NHL Premiere Series in Helsinki, Finland. In 16 minutes of ice time, he had two shots. The following day, Skinner recorded his first career NHL point with an assist on Tuomo Ruutu's goal. He also scored the game winning shootout goal to become the third-youngest player in NHL history to score a shootout goal. On October 20, Skinner scored his first NHL career goal against Jonathan Bernier of the Los Angeles Kings in his fifth game of the season.

Midway through his rookie campaign, Skinner was named to the 2011 All-Star Game roster as an injury replacement for Sidney Crosby, making him the first member of the 2010 draft class to be named to the All-Star Game, and the first 18-year-old NHL All-Star since Steve Yzerman. He was chosen by fellow Hurricane Eric Staal, captain of Team Staal. He was later named January 2011's NHL Rookie of the Month. At the NHL Awards ceremony on June 22, 2011, in Las Vegas, Nevada, Skinner was awarded the Calder Memorial Trophy as the NHL's top rookie, beating-out fellow rookies Logan Couture of the San Jose Sharks and Michael Grabner of the New York Islanders. At that time, he was the NHL's youngest player as well as the first Hurricanes player to ever win the Calder.

After his successful rookie campaign, Skinner was named to Team Canada's National Team to compete at the 2011 IIHF World Championship, becoming the youngest player in the tournament. However, he returned to the Hurricanes lineup for his sophomore season without a medal after Canada placed fifth. Skinner began the season strong, recording 12 goals and 12 assists in 30 games to lead the team in scoring, yet it would be cut short due to a hit by Andy Sutton. The hit which occurred during a game against the Edmonton Oilers on December 7, 2011, caused Skinner to miss time due to a concussion. He eventually returned to the Hurricanes lineup after missing 16 games on January 5, 2012. As Skinner slowly accumulated to playing again, he was suspended two games for kicking Scott Nichol of the St. Louis Blues on March 15, 2012.

During the offseason, and the final year of his Entry Level Contract, Skinner and the Hurricanes agreed to a six-year contract extension worth $34.4 million which would keep him under contract until the 2018–19 season. His third season in the NHL was once again plagued with injuries as on February 14, 2013, Skinner was diagnosed with an upper-body injury, later deemed a concussion, after a game in Toronto.

To begin the 2013–14 season, Skinner recorded nine points in nine games to lead the team. On December 4, 2013 Skinner earned his first career hat trick against the Nashville Predators. However, his high scoring play ended during the 2014–15 season when he sustained a concussion on a hit from Washington Capitals defenceman Matt Niskanen. He accumulated only 31 points that season and had an eight game long pointless streak.

On December 11, 2015, Skinner recorded his second hat trick against the Anaheim Ducks in a 5-1 victory. Three games later, on December 15, 2015, he scored another hat trick, this time against the Philadelphia Flyers. Skinner was named alternate captain of the Hurricanes for the 2016–17 and the 2017–18 seasons.

Buffalo Sabres
On August 2, 2018, after eight seasons with the Hurricanes, Skinner was traded to the Buffalo Sabres in exchange for Cliff Pu, a second-round selection in the 2019 NHL Entry Draft, a third-Round pick in the 2020 NHL Entry Draft, and a sixth-round pick the same draft. In November 2018, Skinner became the second player in Sabres' history to score 20 goals before December, and the seventh player to score at least 20 goals in less than 27 games. On April 6, Skinner scored twice in the season finale against the Detroit Red Wings, upping his total to 40 goals scored on the season, the first time in his career that he has reached that mark.

On June 7, 2019, Skinner re-signed with the Sabres on an eight-year, $72 million contract extension with an annual average of $9 million. He struggled under new head coach Ralph Krueger, receiving limited icetime and limited opportunities, scoring just 21 goals and 37 points in 102 games in the next 2 seasons.

In 2021–22, Skinner enjoyed a bounce back season under new head coach Don Granato, scoring 33 goals and matching his career-high of 63 points for the fourth time. He received a three-game suspension for cross-checking Jake Guentzel of the Pittsburgh Penguins during an altercation between the Penguins and Sabres on December 9, 2022.

Personal life
During his tenure with the Hurricanes, Skinner launched the '53's Difference Makers' Program, aimed to recognize local teachers at home games.

Career statistics

Regular season and playoffs

International

References

External links
 

1992 births
Living people
Buffalo Sabres players
Calder Trophy winners
Canadian expatriate ice hockey players in the United States
Canadian ice hockey left wingers
Carolina Hurricanes draft picks
Carolina Hurricanes players
Ice hockey people from Ontario
Kitchener Rangers players
National Hockey League All-Stars
National Hockey League first-round draft picks
Sportspeople from Markham, Ontario